Fuentes is a Spanish language surname meaning "fountains." Notable people with the surname include:

Adrián Fuentes (born 1996), Spanish football (soccer) player
Adriana Fuentes Cortés (born 1968), Mexican politician of the National Action Party (PAN)
Adriana Fuentes Téllez (born 1964), Mexican politician of the Institutional Revolutionary Party (PRI)
Agustin Fuentes, American primatologist
Alberto Fuentes Mohr (1927–1979), Guatemalan economist and politician
Alejandra Fuentes (born 1980), Venezuelan diver
Alejandro Jano Fuentes (1972–2019), Mexican singer
Alejandro Javiero Fuentes (born 1999), Norwegian singer born in Chile
Alfredo Felipe Fuentes (born 1949), Cuban journalist and activist
Amado Carrillo Fuentes (1956-1997), Mexican drug lord
Amalia Fuentes (1940–2019), Filipina actress
Amarilis Fuentes (1894–1955), Ecuadorian teacher and suffragist
Andrea Fuentes (born 1983), Spanish synchronised swimmer, sister of Tina Fuentes
Ángel Fuentes (born 1996), Spanish road cyclist
Angel Fuentes (born 1961), Puerto Rican American politician of the Democratic Party
Brian Fuentes (born 1975), American pro baseball player
Carlos Fuentes (1928-2020), Mexican writer
Carmen Fuentes (born 1965), Spanish long-distance runner
Daisy Fuentes (born 1966),  Cuban-American model, actress, and television show hostess
Erasmo Fuentes (born 1943), Mexican-born sculptor
Eufemiano Fuentes (born 1945) Spanish sports doctor
Eugenio Fuentes (born 1958), Spanish novelist
Fabricio Fuentes (born 1976), Argentine football (soccer) player
Gregorio Fuentes, (1897-2002) Spanish-Cuban, who is credited by some as a model for Ernest Hemingway's protagonist, Santiago, in The Old Man and the Sea 
Gustavo Fuentes (born 1973), Argentine football (soccer) player 
Heidemarie Fuentes, American actress and producer
Hernán Fuentes (1918–1999), Chilean modern pentathlete
Humberto Fuentes (born 1961), Venezuelan weightlifter
Ivette Fuentes (born 1972), Mexican theoretical physicist
José Fuentes (judoka) (born 1960), Puerto Rican judoka
José Francisco Fuentes (c. 1966–2009), Mexican politician
José Luis Fuentes (born 1985), Venezuelan male artistic gymnast
Josh Fuentes (born 1993), American baseball player
Jovita Fuentes (1895–1978), Filipina soprano singer
Julio Fuentes (pentathlete) (born 1960), Chilean modern pentathlete
Julio Fuentes Serrano (1954–2001), Spanish journalist
Julio M. Fuentes (born 1946), Puerto Rican Senior United States federal judge
Katty Fuentes (born c. 1976), Mexican beauty queen
Luis Fuentes (wrestler) (born 1946), Guatemalan wrestler
Lupe Fuentes (born 1987), Colombian music producer, DJ, and former pornographic actress
Marcos Fuentes, (born 1973), Mexican football (soccer) player and manager
Mariola Fuentes (born 1970), Spanish actress
Mercedes Fuentes (born 1958), Spanish handball player
Miguel Fuentes (1946-1970), major-league pitcher
Miguel Ángel Fuentes (born 1964), Spanish football (soccer) player
Miguel de Jesús Fuentes (born 1971), Mexican football (soccer) goalkeeper
Mike Fuentes (born 1958), American baseball player
Mike Fuentes (musician) (born 1984), American musician, drummer for band Pierce The Veil
Miren Ortubay Fuentes (born 1958), Spanish lawyer, criminologist, professor 
Moisés Fuentes (born 1985), Mexican professional boxer
Nelson Fuentes (born 1978), Salvadoran economist and politician
Nick Fuentes (born 1998), American white supremacist political commentator
Nicolás Fuentes (1941–2015), Peruvian football (soccer) player
Nina Fuentes (born 1968), Venezuelan artist, art collector, curator, and art dealer
Orlando Fuentes (born 1974), American judoka
Don Pedro Enríquez de Acevedo, Count of Fuentes, Spanish governor of Milan
Pedro Fuentes (born 1957), Cuban weightlifter
Reymond Fuentes (born 1991), Puerto Rican baseballer
Rosa Fuentes (born 1965), Mexican freestyle swimmer
Rubén Fuentes (1926–2022), Mexican violinist & composer
Sammy Fuentes (born 1964), Puerto Rican boxer
Sebastián Fuentes (born 1987), Uruguayan football (soccer) player
Susan Fuentes (1954–2013), Filipina singer
Thomas Fuentes, former Assistant Director of the FBI
Tina Fuentes (1984–2018), Spanish synchronised swimmer, sister of Andrea Fuentes
Tina Fuentes (artist) (born 1949), American painter
Tito Fuentes (born 1944), Cuban-American pro baseball player
Tom Fuentes (1948–2012), American politician of the Republican Party
Fernando de Fuentes (born 1894), Mexican film director, considered a pioneer in the film industry worldwide
Vic Fuentes (born 1983), American musician, singer for band Pierce The Veil
Yaremis Fuentes (born 1991), Cuban football (soccer) player
Zetna Fuentes, American television director

Fictional characters:
Isabel Fuentes, Mexican-American character portrayed by Mexican-American actress Salma Hayek in the movie Fools Rush In
Marisol Fuentes, Mexican-American character portrayed by American actress Cree Cicchino in the Netflix series Mr Iglesias

References

Spanish-language surnames